Khezeriyeh (also Romanized as Khezerīyeh, Khezrīyeh, Khazarīyeh, and Khazrīyeh; also known as Khaẕrīāt) is a village in Soveyseh Rural District, in the Soveyseh District of Karun County, Khuzestan Province, Iran. At the 2006 census, its population was 312, in 57 families.

References 

Populated places in Karun County